Peregrinus is a genus of planthoppers belonging to the family Delphacidae.

The species of this genus are found in America, Africa and Malesia.

Species:

Peregrinus iocasta 
Peregrinus maidis

References

Delphacidae